Shani Gandhi is an Australian music producer, engineer and mixer based in Nashville, Tennessee. A native of Perth, she moved to Ithaca, New York in 2007, to pursue a Bachelor of Music degree at Ithaca College. Her career in Nashville has paired her with such producers as Gary Paczosa, Michael Wagener, Neal Cappellino, and Marshall Altman. Gandhi has engineered and mixed albums for the likes of Alison Krauss & Union Station, George Jones & The Smoky Mountain Boys, Kelsea Ballerini, Sarah Jarosz, Parker Millsap and Sierra Hull.

Gandhi mixed three songs on Kelsea Ballerini's Platinum Certified album The First Time (2015), including its third single Peter Pan, which also received platinum certification and topped the Billboard US Country Airplay and US Hot Country Songs Charts in the same week.

In 2017, Gandhi received a Grammy Award for Best Folk Album as Engineer for Sarah Jarosz's, Undercurrent. She was also nominated for Grammy Award for Best Engineered Album, Non-Classical, along with Gary Paczosa, for the same album.

In 2020, Gandhi was nominated for the 63rd Grammy Awards for Best Engineered Album, Non-Classical as Engineer for Sierra Hull's 25 Trips.

Discography

References

External links
 

Year of birth missing (living people)
Living people
Australian people of Indian descent
Australian audio engineers
Australian expatriates in the United States
Australian record producers
Ithaca College alumni
Musicians from Nashville, Tennessee
Musicians from Perth, Western Australia